Royal Communications is a branch of the Private Secretary's Office of the Royal Household of the Sovereign of the United Kingdom responsible for media relations and communicating with various organisations and authorities on matters to do with The King and the Royal Family. Until early 2014, Royal Communications was known as the Royal Household Press Office.

The head of Royal Communications is the Communications Secretary to the King and Queen Consort. The post is currently held by Tobyn Andreae.

Communications Secretaries
In 2014, the press offices of members of the Royal Family merged for a time at Buckingham Palace, though individual Communications Secretaries for members of the Royal Family were retained. Those members of the Royal Family who do not have their own Communications Secretaries are represented by that of The King and Queen Consort.

The current Communications Secretaries within the Royal Household are:
 Tobyn Andreae (Communications Secretary to The King and Queen Consort)
 Lee Thompson (Communications Secretary to The Prince and Princess of Wales)

Former Press Office positions
Many officials have been made members of the Royal Victorian Order, at grade Member (MVO), Lieutenant (LVO), Commander (CVO), or Knight Commander (KCVO).

Director of Royal Communications (2014–2018) 
• Sally Osman, LVO 2014–2018

The Queen's Media Secretary (2016–2018) 
• Steve Kingstone, MVO 2016–2018

List of Communications & Press Secretary to The Queen 
 James Roscoe, MVO 2013–2017
 Ailsa Anderson, LVO 2010–2013 
 Samantha Cohen, LVO 2007–2010
 Miss Penelope Russell-Smith, CVO 2002–07

List of Deputy Press Secretary to The Queen 
 Steve Kingstone, MVO 2013–2016
 James Roscoe, MVO 2012–2013
 Ed Perkins, MVO 2010–2012
 Ailsa Anderson, LVO 2007–2010
 Samantha Cohen, LVO 2003–2007
 Penelope Russell-Smith, LVO 1998–2002
 Geoffrey Crawford, CVO 1993–1997
 John Haslam, LVO 1988–1993

List of Communications Secretaries (1998–2002)
 Simon Walker 2000–2002
 Simon Lewis 1998–2000

List of Press Secretaries to the Sovereign (1918–2002)
 Penelope Russell-Smith, LVO 2000–2002
 Geoffrey Crawford, CVO 1997–2000
 Charles Anson, LVO 1990–1997
 Robin Janvrin, LVO 1987–1990
 Michael Shea, CVO 1978–1987
 Ronald Allison, CVO 1973–1978
 Robin Ludlow, 1972–1973
 William Heseltine, CVO 1968–1972
 Richard Colville, KCVO CB DSC 1947–1968
 Lewis Ritchie, KCVO CBE Royal Navy 1944–1947
vacant 1931–1944
 Sir Frank Mitchell, CBE MVO 1920–1931
 Samuel Pryor 1918–1920

List of Assistant Press Secretaries to the Sovereign
 1947–1957: Hon. Alexander Hood
 1958–1981: Anne Hawkins (Wall from 1975)
 1959–1960: Joseph Bennet Odunton
1965–1967: William Heseltine
1970–1974: Lawrence Bryant

References

Positions within the British Royal Household